There are four species of lizard named bark anole:
 Anolis distichus, native to Hispaniola and the Bahamas
 Anolis ortonii, found in Brazil, French Guiana, Suriname, Guyana, Ecuador, Colombia, Peru, and Bolivia
 Anolis properus, native to the Dominican Republic
 Anolis ravitergum, native to the Dominican Republic